National Kinney Corporation was a parking, property management services, and real estate development company based in New York City. It was established on August 7, 1971 when Kinney National Company spun off its non-entertainment assets due to a financial scandal over its parking operations.

History
National Kinney expanded from parking and building services into real estate development by purchasing the Uris Buildings Corporation, but the timing was bad as the NY real estate market collapsed in the 1973-75 recession and the main Uris Building asset was soon lost to foreclosure.

In March 1974, Societe de Gestion Immobiliere et Mobiliere S.A., a French holding company, announced that they were interested to buy National Kinney Corporation from Warner Communications for $8 million in cash. However, the deal between two companies was terminated on June 22 of that same year. Four years later, on December 28, National Kinney was spun out from Warner Communications as an independent company. The corporation was acquired by Morton Sweig and Paul Milstein, a former president of National Kinney.

In 1979, after some protracted negotiations, National Kinney attempted to purchase The Aladdin hotel and casino in Las Vegas in a joint venture with Johnny Carson, planning to rename it after the star. However, Carson's wife Joanna gossiped about the deal, and subsequent trading in National Kinney stock led to insider trading charges against third parties by the SEC and the disgorgement of profits.

In 1982, National Kinney sold its National States Electric division to an undisclosed buyer, and then agreed to sell its parking subsidiary, Kinney System Inc., to that division's chairman Daniel Katz and a group of investors. In 1983, National Kinney subsequently renamed itself to Andal Corporation and sold its remaining majority interest in Kinney System parking. In 1997, Kinney System was acquired by Central Parking Corporation. Andal invested in the declining Steve's Ice Cream and merged in Swensen's before selling them off and unwinding its last operating subsidiary in 2010.

References

See also
 Kinney National Company
 Kinney Parking Company
 Warner Bros.-Seven Arts
 Warner Communications

1971 establishments in New York City
1983 disestablishments in New York (state)
American companies established in 1971
Companies based in New York City
Parking companies
Property management companies
Real estate companies of the United States
Real estate companies established in 1971
American companies disestablished in 1985
Corporate spin-offs
Real estate companies disestablished in the 20th century
Former Time Warner subsidiaries